Ekaterina Dzehalevich (born 3 May 1986) is a former professional Belarusian tennis player. Her career-high singles ranking is world No. 134, which she reached on 6 October 2008. Her highest in doubles is 64, which she reached on 29 September 2008. 

In her career, Dzehalevich won four singles and 13 doubles titles on the ITF Women's Circuit. She was coached by her mother Tamara who also introduced her to tennis. Her last appearance was in the 2015 Neva Cup in Saint Petersburg.

WTA career finals

Doubles: 2 (1–1)

ITF finals

Singles (4–9)

Doubles (13-11)

References

External links
 
 
 

1986 births
Living people
Tennis players from Minsk
Belarusian female tennis players
21st-century Belarusian women